Energy use and development in Africa varies widely across the continent, with some African countries exporting energy to neighbors or the global market, while others lack even basic infrastructures or systems to acquire energy. The World Bank has declared 32 of the 48 nations on the continent to be in an energy crisis. Energy development has not kept pace with rising demand in developing regions, placing a large strain on the continent's existing resources over the first decade of the new century. From 2001 to 2005, GDP for over half of the countries in Sub Saharan Africa rose by over 4.5% annually, while generation capacity grew at a rate of 1.2%.

Overview

Statistics

Social, economic, and demographic diversity
According to the World Development Report published by the World Bank in 2012, Africa's economy is about the size of the Netherlands' economy, which is equivalent to only approximately six percent of the U.S. economy. Akin Iwayemi, a professor at University of Ibadan in Nigeria, suggests that there is potentially a “strong feedback relationship between the energy sector and the national economy.” Determining socio-economic indicators in Africa include population, population density, land area, proportion of citizens living in an urban setting, and Gross Domestic Product (GNP) per capita.

Overall, the African continent is a net energy exporter. In 2009 the net energy export was 40% of the energy production 13,177 TWh. The world share of energy production in Africa was 12% of oil and 7% of gas in 2009.

Current energy usage in Africa

The percentage of residences with access to electricity in Sub-Saharan Africa is the lowest in the world. In some remote regions, fewer than one in every 20 households has electricity.

Energy in Africa is a scarcer commodity than in the developed world – annual consumption is 518 KWh in Sub-Saharan Africa, the same amount of electricity used by an individual in an Organization for Economic Cooperation and Development (OECD – example is the U.S.) country in 25 days. More than 500 million people live without electricity. Across the continent only 10% of individuals have access to the electrical grid, and of those, 75% come from the richest two quintiles in overall income. Less than 2% of the rural populations of Malawi, Ethiopia, Niger, and Chad have access to electrical power. Electrical provisioning in Africa has generally only reached wealthy, urban middle class, and commercial sectors, bypassing the region's large rural populations and urban poor. According to the forum of Energy Ministers of Africa, most agriculture still relies primarily on humans and animals for energy input. The electrical industry in Africa faces the economic paradox that raising prices will prohibit access to their services, but that they cannot afford to roll out additional infrastructure to drive prices down and increase access without additional capital.

Overall rates of access to energy in Africa have held constant since the 1980s, while the rest of the developing world has seen electrical grid distribution increase by 20%. Sub-Saharan Africa is the only region in the world where per-capita access rates are falling. According to recent trends, over 60% of Sub-Saharan Africans will still lack access to electricity by 2020.

Moreover, Africa has an average electrification rate of 24%, while the rate in the rest of the developing world lies closer to 40%. Even in the areas covered by the electrical grid, power is often unreliable: the manufacturing sector loses power on average 56 days out of the year. In Senegal power is out 25 days a year, in Tanzania 63 days, and in Burundi 144 days. Frequent power outages cause damage to sales, equipment, and discourage international investment. According to the periodical African Business, “Poor transport links and irregular power supplies have stunted the growth of domestic companies and discouraged foreign firms from setting up manufacturing plants in the continent."

Despite its unreliability, electrical service in Sub-Saharan Africa also costs more than in other parts of the world. The protective tariff required in Sub-Saharan Africa is US$0.13, compared to $0.04–0.08 USD in the rest of the developing world. Additionally, one of the greatest challenges in an effort to create sustainable development in Africa is that many countries with exportable resources are land-locked without a system of transportation.

Although Africa lacks a sufficient transport system, new developments in industry and manufacturing have resulted in tremendous population growth, increased urbanization, high energy consumption, over-cultivation of lands, and significant industrial advancements engendered by globalization. Professor Iwayemi of University of Ibadan in Nigeria states that the “fundamental energy question facing Africa [is]…providing and maintaining widespread access of the population to reliable and affordable supplies of environmentally cleaner energy to meet the requirements of rapid economic growth and improved living standards.” In correspondence to The Africa Society, the population growth of sub-Saharan Africa is 2.2% annually; therefore, by 2025, it is estimated that Africa will consist of over a billion people. If this mathematical model is correct environmental problems could double or even triple by 2025.

Perhaps a confounding variable of these trends is that less than 1% of the electricity generated in the Africa originates from renewable resources, as the White Paper on Energy Policy proclaims. The main objectives of the paper were to “increase access to affordable energy services, improve energy governance, stimulate economic growth, manage energy-related environmental impacts, and ensure security of supply through diversification.”

Africa's environmental potential

The African continent features many sustainable energy resources, of which only a small percentage have been harnessed. 5–7% of the continent's hydroelectric potential has been tapped, and only 0.6% of its geothermal. The publication Energy Economics estimates that replacing South African coal power with hydroelectric imported from the Democratic Republic of the Congo could save 40 million tons of carbon dioxide emissions annually. 2011 estimates place African geothermal capacity at 14,000 MW, of which only 60 MW has been tapped. The African Energy Policy Research Network calculates that biomass from agricultural waste alone could meet the present electrical needs of 16 south eastern countries with bagasse-based cogeneration. The sugar industry in Mauritius already provides 25% of the country's energy from byproduct cogeneration, with the potential for up to 13 times that amount with a widespread rollout cogeneration technology and process optimization.

According to Stephen Karekezi, Director of African Energy Policy Research Network and co-worker Waeni Kithyoma, Africa is third largest in crude oil reserves (behind the Middle East and Latin America), third largest in natural gas resources (behind the Middle East and Europe), second greatest for uranium (behind Australia), and is plentiful in hydro energy potentials and other renewable energy, such as bio-energy and solar energy. Professor Iwayemi states that there are conventional energy sources in Africa: hydroelectric and wood fuels, coal lignite, crude oil, natural gas and nuclear fuels, and there are unconventional energy sources, such as solar, geothermal, biomass, oil and tar sands, wind energy and tidal energy from the influence of the sea.

In addition, South Africa alone obtains the sixth largest coal reserves on the planet, after China, the US, India, Russia and Australia. Specific renewable resources in South Africa include solar, wind, hydropower, wave energy, and bio-energy.

Human capabilities of energy in Africa

Professor Iwayemi suggests that “commercial energy use remains a key factor in human development.” Commercial energy can include solar powered systems and the like.

In addition, The Africa Society admits that much of Africa's apparent facilitation of poverty is the result of degradation of agriculture and arable lands, as well as, the mismanagement of water resources. A large contributing factor to these events and others, such as famine, is deforestation. Clean energy potentiality in Africa could therefore reduce environmental degradation, and consequently, poverty.

To provide an example, implementation of biodiesel technology has potential for the creation of jobs, as well as consequent economic development in disadvantaged rural communities. This form of clean energy also enables energy security for many nations throughout the globe including those in Africa, and reduces greenhouse gas emissions rather significantly.

The Capabilities Approach

Sen, an Indian economist, has assimilated a concept referred to as "The Capabilities Approach," in which he suggests that “poverty can be sensibly identified in terms of capability deprivation.” Further, he states that “relative deprivation in terms of incomes can yield absolute deprivation in terms of capabilities.” He believes that the freedom to achieve well-being is of great importance, and can lead to increased capabilities. Energy could facilitate a great deal of freedom, for individuals could gain access to a wide variety of resources.

Challenges facing energy in Africa

The high upfront capital cost of many resources, particularly renewable resources, is one of the most critical barriers to the development of an energy market. Other challenges include the lack of food security and limited water resources, for these factors are necessary for life and therefore take priority over energy initiation.

Energy utilization and availability

North Africa
North Africa is dominant in oil and in gas, for Libya obtains approximately 50% of the oil reserves available in Africa. Libya designated US$5 billion to assert programs and regulations that will reduce carbon emissions. Resources, such as oil and gas, are also prevalent in Algeria, in addition to natural gas. According to the Renewable Energy Sector in N. Africa, solar capacity is also extremely relevant in North Africa. The total power installed in North Africa region was roughly 61.6 GW in 2012. This is mostly made up of hydro accounting for nearly 10%.

Southern Africa

Southern Africa has 91 percent of all of Africa's coal reserves and 70% of the nuclear/uranium resources in Africa, according to Professor Iwayemi. Southern Africa follows Central Africa closely in hydro resources; hydroelectric potential can particularly be found in the Congo DRC, Mozambique, Zambia, Cameroon, Ethiopia, Sudan, and Nigeria. Mozambique in particular has joined an international initiative to develop an energy action plan, to contribute to Sustainable Energy for All.

In accordance with The Africa Society, USAID's Living in the Finite Environment program has helped form 15 protected areas in Southern Africa, encompassing nearly 40,000 community members, known as conservancies in Namibia.

The country of South Africa alone obtains the sixth largest coal reserves on the planet, after China, the US, India, Russia and Australia. Specific renewable resources in South Africa include solar, wind, hydro power, wave energy, and bio-energy.

, Zambia is in a massive power crisis that began in June. In Lusaka the eight-hour blackouts cause families to cook on a simple charcoal fire. The reason for this is poor rainfall, causing less hydroelectric output.

Despite recent improvements and the sub-Saharan African off-grid solar industry's rapid expansion over the past ten years, some 600 million people in the region still lack access to power.

East Africa
The Africa Society portrays that promotion of sustainable use of natural resources is occurring in Kenya and in Uganda; Kenya and Uganda are “improving community-based wildlife management, strengthening forestry and environmental management, and enhancing integrated coastal zone management…[this] reduces conflicts between communities and protected areas by promoting access rights, revenue sharing…,” etc. Kenya also organized an instrumental energy plan to support development and economic growth.

In Tanzania, the goal is to conserve biodiversity. “The USAID supports local actions in the Pangani, Bagamoyo, and Mkuranga districts that promote sustainable coastal and marine resources management through co-management for near-shore fishery areas, small-scale enterprise development, marine culture, and coastal tourism.” There is also an essential push for geothermal power in East Africa, given the arid climate.

Norway also supports the replacement of kerosene lamps with alternatives facilitated from solar power in Kenya, access to energy in Ethiopia's rural areas for job growth and a better standard of living, and Liberia's implementation of a climate plan.

West Africa
Electricity access in Ghana increased 500% between 1991 and 2000, but per capita consumption actually fell over the same period, suggesting electricity usage was unaffordable. Ghana was also one of the primary countries to develop an energy action plan, in response to the initiative for Sustainable Energy for All.

Nigeria is currently a dumping ground for electronic products, which leach toxic metals and substances such as lead, mercury, cadmium, arsenic, antimony, and trioxide into water sources. When burned, carcinogenic dioxins and polyaromatic hydrocarbons are emitted and toxic chemicals like barium are transmitted into the soil. The 1989 Basel Convention established an international treaty designed to regulate hazardous waste from being dumped into the developing world.

In reflection of statements made in Prof. Iwayemi's essay, West Africa does have some coal reserves – approximately 10 percent of coal in Africa, particularly Nigeria. West Africa also exhibits some nuclear resources. In addition to coal reserves, Nigeria contains natural gas and oil resources.

“In Guinea, West Africa, the US is making significant input in the area of environmental protection.” These progressive steps will improve agricultural production technologies and exchange trade opportunities. “In Guinea 115,000 hectares of forests and tree plantations have been placed under sustainable management…USAID has assisted more than 37,000 farmers to improve agricultural production through sustainable management practices, and has helped establish over 2,800 new businesses.”

With a huge discrepancy between urban (70%) and rural (18%) areas, only 40% of people in Benin have access to electricity, leaving over five million without it. Currently, just 10% of homes use off-grid solar equipment.

Central Africa
Central Africa has abundant hydro-electric resources due to the multiple rivers that run through this region. The publication Energy Economics estimates that replacing South African coal power with hydroelectric imported from the Democratic Republic of the Congo could save 40 million tons of carbon dioxide emissions annually.

Africa is protecting forest resources. “USAID will contribute approximately $48 million to partnership through its successful Central African Regional Program for the Environment (CARPE)…goal is to improve forest governance, develop sustainable means of livelihood for 60 million people who live in the Basin, reduce the rate of forest degradation and loss of biodiversity through protected area management, improve logging policies, and achieve sustainable forest use by local inhabitants.”

Human factors and energy

Poverty and health
The utilization of solar water heaters and biodiesel resources in South Africa within recent years reveals that renewable energy can significantly diminish poverty, for the implementation of clean energy systems has led to improvement in health, and general welfare of the people. The assimilation of these programs also generates employment, and develops empowerment of the people due to a localized level of energy operation.

"Since the turn of the century, the Shri Kshetra Dharmasthala Rural Development Project (SKDRDP) has extended micro-credits for renewable energy projects for a total of $3.2 million to poor farmers in the South Indian state of Karnataka. The credits paid for the installation of almost 20,000 biogas plants, solar home systems, improved cooking stoves and family-size pico-hydropower plants".

Inequality
A major concern in Southern Africa is addressing the inequalities associated with the aftermath of the apartheid era. There are also several other factors or occurrences in Africa that lead to inequality, such as one's location of residence (urban vs. rural), one's access to food, water, and energy, and one's freedom to achieve well-being. The Human Development Report of 2013 suggests that the regions with the largest gender inequality index values are West and Central Africa; Liberia has the highest at an index of 143, followed by Central African Republic (142), Mauritania (139), Côte d'Ivoire (138), and Cameroon (137).

Education
Energy can facilitate the development of schools, and help teachers gain access to a wide variety of teaching mechanisms, such as potentially computers. Energy can contribute to the allowance for freedom of education.

Policy

Attracting investment
As a whole, foreign direct investment into Africa has been low. According to the Forum of Energy Ministers of Africa, Africa as a whole receives less than 2% of foreign direct investment across the world.  A survey of 20 Poverty Reduction Strategy Papers prepared by countries across Africa found that most neglect to consider energy or individual energy access as an integral part of their development strategy.  Trans-national initiatives play an important role in development for the entire region too.  One example of international cooperation for energy development is the Chad-Cameroon pipeline.

Additionally, “The United States announced USD $2 billion in grants, loans and loan guarantees across U.S. government agencies and departments for capacity-building projects, policy and regulatory development, public-private partnerships, and loan guarantees to leverage private investment in clean energy technologies.”

Eskom and Duke Energy currently support an initiative to facilitate an electrical roadmap in Southern Africa. “The goal is to connect 500 million people to modern energy service by 2025".

Privatization

Pros
Economic reasoning predicts increased efficiency and lower government overhead from a private contractor.  Privatized Northern Electricity in Namibia implemented improved billing and reduced losses to lower the required energy tariff and lower energy prices. Private companies can also work closely with government to provide the social benefits of a state utility in the short term and the competition of a private market for the long term. South Africa commercialized the formerly public utility Eskom, but worked with them to continue grid expansion. The South African government helps fund new connections and subsidizes the first 100kWh per month for poor households, up from a previous 50kWh per month. By 2005 South Africa's electrification rate had increased to about 70% (from 30% in 1990).

Cons
Privatization can lead to price increases if the market is not otherwise profitable. An unregulated or lightly regulated market could tend towards proven profitable customers too, ignoring riskier opportunities to expand service to rural or poor customers. Extending the electrical grid becomes difficult because of the high upfront investments required to serve a low population density.  According to the Forum of Energy Ministers of Africa, most rural customers can't even afford the install costs of the most basic single phase circuit with an electrical socket.  Energy subsidies are one possible solution, but they can disproportionately effect demographics who already have access to electricity, missing the most poor.

Program management reform
Most development initiatives work at the individual project level, leading to fragmentation and inconsistency between projects that discourage long term investors. Institutional reform is vital to improving the operating efficiency of the electrical sector as a whole. The current hybrid public/private model lacks a clear leading organization with one clear vision of the system's future. Attempts to negotiate management contracts over utility hardware have generally failed, leaving the public utility still burdened with day-to-day hardware support as well as growth, planning, and development. Of 17 high-profile African energy management contracts, four were cancelled before they even reached full term, five were not renewed after only one cycle, and five more were dropped in later years. Only three remain in place today.

Smart utility management must meet increased investment in the middle to smartly allocate resources and develop a sustainable grid model. Of the current utilities, "On average, Africa's state-owned power utilities embody only 40% of good governance practices for such enterprise".

Nevertheless, federal support for energy is gaining momentum, especially in Southern Africa. South Africa's government has established a Joint Implementation Committee to progress the biodiesel industry. This committee encompasses a variety of sub-committees, like “South Renewable Energy Technologies for Poverty Alleviation South Africa: Solar Water Heaters and Biodiesel,” and the “African Petroleum Industry Association. Plans for the promotion of harvest to create bioethanol are underway, the South African Bureau of Standards is developing pricing models to enable economic growth.

“The World Bank and the International Finance Corporation will expand existing programs such as Lighting Africa, which develops off-grid lighting markets, to provide affordable lighting to 70 million low-income households by 2020, as well as undertake new initiatives with the Energy Sector Management Assistance Program, such as mapping of renewable energy resources”.

The Global Ministerial Environment Forum in Nairobi, Kenya was broadcast throughout Africa, and comprised a panel of energy experts who discussed the successes achieved in energy in Africa so far, lessons learned from implementations, and future projections for energy.

Moreover, the United Nations Development Program and UN Capital Development Fund recently initiated a global Clean Start program, which will enable millions of impoverished people both in Africa and in Asia to shift out of energy poverty by creating microfinance opportunities to encourage poorer individuals to purchase and utilize electricity. Twenty-five countries in Africa have joined this global task: Botswana, Burundi, Burkina Faso, Cape Verde, Côte d'Ivoire, Democratic Republic of Congo, Ethiopia, Gambia, Ghana, Guinea, Kenya, Lesotho, Liberia, Malawi, Mozambique, Namibia, Nigeria, São Tomé and Príncipe, Senegal, Sierra Leone, Tanzania, Togo, Uganda, Zambia, and Zimbabwe.

Future development

A sample of current investments
The World Bank operates a portfolio of 48 Sub-Saharan Africa energy projects with over US$3 billion in investment. Individual governments as well as private entities also contribute to overall energy projects.  China and India have recently emerged as large players in the space, committing US$2 billion annually to new development projects. China focused specifically on 10 large hydropower projects, which combined are expected to produce another 6,000 MW of electrical energy. This is estimated to increase the hydroelectric capabilities of Sub-Saharan Africa by 30%. Another project currently undergoing feasibility exploration would install hydroelectric facilities on the Zambezi river, potentially generating 2,000–2,500 MW. Smaller scale projects also receive funding, such as efforts to distribute safe cookstoves and efficient kilns to lower the effects of biomass, initiatives to improve lighting efficiency, or smaller scale microgrid electrical distributions.

Regional pools

One characterizing feature of the electrical grid in Africa is its isolation. The formation of regional energy trading pools would help stabilize energy markets, but would require building out a transmission line infrastructure between countries. Installing those resources would be expected to require ~US$19 billion in investment.  Regional energy trade would save an estimated US$5 billion annually in emergency generation costs, yielding a 22% rate of return even at 5% deflation.  Energy economist Orvika Rosnes estimates that fair regional pooling in the least developed countries could actually generate money in less than one year, with a 168% annual return on investment.

Projected needs
Creating an effective and far-reaching modern electrical system in Africa will take significant investment.  The African Development Bank has estimated that a universal access system for all 53 countries in Africa would cost US$547 billion total to implement by 2030, which averages to US$27 billion per year. Total investment has not come close to this mark, instead hovering until recently between $1–2 billion USD annually.  Recent participation from China and India on the order of US$2 Billion annually brings the investment total up to ~US$4 billion.  The power sector still faces a finance gap on the order of US$23 billion per year though, severely constraining its development options.  Operating at 1/4 of the necessary budget to grow and expand, current networks must mark most funds for maintenance of aging existing systems.

Aid and world energy supply capabilities

Relationship to the Millennium Development Goals
Access to modern forms of Energy can impact socio-economic parameters like income, education, and life expectancy.  Energy can act as a multiplier of the Millennium Development Goals through its ability to stimulate economic growth to generate employment, improve educational opportunities, and improve general health compared to existing energy sources.  Research of past successful development suggests that energy, especially from transportation and industry, helped drive growth and modernization
 Eradicate extreme poverty and hunger: Access to contemporary energy can help generate jobs, industrial activities, transportation, and modernized agriculture in Africa. Most African staple foods need processing, which can be aided and made more efficient by modern energy.  Access to liquefied propane gas stoves in Senegal led to major domestic time savings and improved nutrition.
 Achieve universal primary education: Energy access improves the capabilities of schools and lowers the sustenance chore burden on children (female children in particular), allowing them more time to pursue education.  Energy can also improve the quality of schools and build connections to surrounding communities.
 Promote gender equality and empower women: Household activities traditionally done by women could be made more efficient, leaving time for other means of self-development or productive economic input.
 Reduce child mortality: Modern energy can allow reliable access to better sources of water and lowers the indoor air pollution from existing biomaterial burning cooking stoves.
 Improved maternal health: Energy development lowers a mother's risk from indoor air pollution or water borne illness.  Electricity also enables better illumination in health clinics for safer night deliveries.  Poorly ventilated surroundings have been linked to chronic respiratory diseases like tuberculosis, bronchitis, and lung cancer.
 Combat HIV/AIDS, malaria, and other diseases: Electrification allows for sterilization, illumination, and refrigeration.  Modern communication technologies can also aid information dissemination from public health officials.
 Ensure environmental sustainability: Transitioning to modern energy models will facilitate future sustainable resource development and slow present land resource degradation.  Research has linked charcoal production to desertification and deforestation.

 Adapted from table 2.1 in The Forum of Energy Ministers of Africa. Energy and the Millennium Development Goals in Africa. Rep. N.p.: ESMAP, n.d. Print, p. 10. Originally from “The Energy Challenge for Achieving the Millennium Development Goals.” UNEnergy, New York.

References